Dabha is a town in the Aravalli district of Gujarat, in Western India.

History 
Dabha was a princely state and taluka, comprising eight more villages, covering twelve square miles in Mahi Kantha Agency and ruled by Makwana Koli chieftains.

It had a population of 1,307 in 1901, yielding a state revenue of 4,379 Rupees (mostly from land), paying tributes of 150 Rupees to the Gaikwar Baroda State and 53 Rupees to the nearby Amliyara State.

References

Cities and towns in Aravalli district
Princely states of Gujarat

External links 
 A Collection of Treaties, Engagements, and Sanads Relating to India and Neighbouring Countries, Volume 6
 The Cyclopædia of India and of Eastern and Southern Asia: Commercial, Industrial and Scientific Products of the Mineral, Vegetable, and Animal Kingdoms, Useful Arts and Manufactures, Volume 1 by Edward Balfour